The Beatles Box Set is a sixteen-disc box set compiling the entire recorded works of the Beatles as issued by the band between 1962 and 1970. It was released on 15 November 1988 in Britain and America, with the same catalogue number (Apple BBX2-91302) in each of those countries. While available also in vinyl LP and cassette formats, the box set was the first complete collection of original Beatles material to be released by EMI and Capitol Records on compact disc.

The Beatles Box Set included all of the original UK album releases by the band, together with the 1967 US album Magical Mystery Tour. The latter had been issued in the UK in November 1976, at which point the LP version superseded the original British EP of the same name. The box also contained the 1988 compilations Past Masters: Volume One and Past Masters: Volume Two, which grouped together singles, B-sides, EP tracks, and foreign releases not found on the band's UK studio albums. Although all these albums had been previously available in stereo on both LP and cassette, the versions of the first four albums included in The Beatles Box Set were the digitally remastered mono mixes issued on CD over 1987–88, which caused a considerable furor among Beatles fans and audiophiles.

The collection was encased in a black oak roll-top box and included a soft-cover book with commentary on the songs by Beatles recording historian Mark Lewisohn. The set was also issued in a black vinyl covered cardboard box in Japan. Although The Beatles Box Set failed to chart in either the UK or the US, it was certified platinum by the Recording Industry Association of America.

A new Stereo Box, containing remastered versions of the Beatles' core albums and Past Masters, was released on 9 September 2009 along with The Beatles in Mono and new stereo reissues of the individual albums, including the first four albums given their stereo debuts on CD.

Album listing

See also
The Beatles Collection
The Beatles Box
The Beatles: The Collection
The Beatles Mono Collection
The Beatles (The Original Studio Recordings)
The Beatles in Mono

Notes

1988 compilation albums
The Beatles compilation albums
Apple Records compilation albums
Parlophone compilation albums
Capitol Records compilation albums
Albums produced by George Martin
Albums produced by Chris Thomas (record producer)
Albums produced by Phil Spector
Albums recorded at Apple Studios
Albums recorded at Olympic Sound Studios
Albums recorded at Trident Studios
Albums arranged by George Martin
Albums arranged by George Harrison
Albums arranged by Mike Leander
Albums arranged by John Lennon
Albums arranged by Paul McCartney
Albums conducted by George Martin
Albums conducted by George Harrison
Albums conducted by John Lennon
Albums conducted by Paul McCartney
Compilation albums published posthumously
Reissue albums